Seoul National University (SNU) is one of ten Flagship Korean National Universities located in Seoul, South Korea. Founded in 1946, Seoul National University is largely considered the most prestigious university in South Korea; it is one of the three "SKY" universities, denoting the top three institutions in the country. The university has three campuses: the main campus in Gwanak District and two additional campuses in Daehangno and Pyeongchang County. The university comprises sixteen colleges, one graduate school and nine professional schools. The student body consists of nearly 17,000 undergraduate and 11,000 graduate students. According to data compiled by KEDI, the university spends more on its students per capita than any other universities in the country that enroll at least 10,000 students.

Seoul National University holds a memorandum of understanding with over 700 academic institutions in 40 countries, the World Bank and a general academic exchange program with the University of Pennsylvania. Moreover, the university is part of Washington University in St. Louis's McDonnell International Scholars Academy. The Graduate School of Business offers dual master's degrees with Duke University, ESSEC Business School, Hitotsubashi University and Yale School of Management and MBA-, MS- and PhD-candidate exchange programs with universities in ten countries on four continents. Furthermore, the Graduate School of International Studies offers dual master's degree with the Graduate School of Public Policy, University of Tokyo, ESSEC Business School, KU Leuven's Faculty of Social Science, the Faculty of Humanities at the University of Tübingen and Peking University's School of International Studies, as well as exchange programs at distinguished universities in 17 countries for MA- and PhD-candidates. Following a government mandate to globalize Korean universities, the university's international faculty head count peaked at 242 or 4% of the total in 2010, but subsequently declined.

Seoul National University, and specifically its undergraduate liberal arts college, finds its roots in the remaining properties from the abolished Keijō Imperial University, one of the Imperial Universities founded by the Japanese Empire. In the 1940s, with US Military Ordinance No.102 of United States Army Military Government in Korea, Keijo Imperial University was abolished. Later, the government of the Republic of Korea merged the remaining properties with nine colleges and professional schools, and the consolidated institution was renamed Seoul National University in accordance with the Act of the National University Seoul enacted by the National Assembly.

History

Pre-establishment
Seoul National University originates from various educational institutions established by King Gojong of the Joseon dynasty. Several of them were integrated into various colleges when Seoul National University was founded later.

To modernize the country, Gojong initiated the establishment of modern higher education institutions. By means of the issue of a royal order, the law academy Beopkwan Yangseongso has been founded on March 25, 1895. It produced 209 graduates including the later envoy Yi Tjoune. Hanseong Sabeomhakgyo (established in 1895), a training school for teachers and Euihakkyo (1899), a medical school, are also considered the origins of respective colleges.

After the proclamation of the Korean Empire in 1897, Gojong, the then emperor, was motivated to create more modern education institutions. In 1899, a medical school was established. This school changed its name several times to Daehan Euiwon Gyoyukbu and Gyeongseong Euihak Jeonmunhakgyo (Gyeongseong Medical College) and finally became College of Medicine of Seoul National University. In 1901, a department for nursing was established, which was the forerunner of the later College of Nursing.

During the Japanese rule, Keijō Imperial University was established as one of Japan's nine imperial universities. After World War II and the independence of Korea, the name of the university was changed from Keijō Teikoku Daigaku (京城帝国大学) to Gyeongseong Daehak (경성대학, 京城大學, Gyeongseong University). The Hanja that were used in the name were pronounced in the Korean reading and the attribute "Imperial" was removed. The renaming to "National" was based on the academic nationalism supported by the US military regime in Korea at the time.

Establishment
Seoul National University was founded on August 27, 1946, by merging ten institutions of higher education around the Seoul area. The schools which have been merged were:
 Gyeongseong (Seoul) University (Gyeongseong (Seoul) Daehak, 경성(서울)대학)
 Gyeongseong College of Education (Gyeongseong Sabeomhakgyo, 경성사범학교)
 Gyeongseong Women's College of Education (Gyeongseong Yeoja Sabeomhakgyo, 경성여자사범학교)
 Gyeongseong Law College (Gyeongseong Beophak Jeonmunhakgyo, 경성법학전문학교)
 Gyeongseong Industrial College (Gyeongseong Gongeop Jeonmunhakgyo, 경성공업전문학교)
 Gyeongseong Mining College (Gyeongseong Gwangsan Jeonmunhakgyo, 경성광산전문학교)
 Gyeongseong Medical College (Gyeongseong Euihak Jeonmunhakgyo, 경성의학전문학교)
 Suwon Agriculture College (Suwon Nongnim Jeonmunhakgyo, 수원농림전문학교)
 Gyeongseong College of Economics (Gyeongseong Gyeongje Jeonmunhakgyo, 경성경제전문학교)
 Gyeongseong Dentistry College (Gyeongseong Chigwa Euihak Jeonmunhakgyo, 경성치과의학전문학교)

The first president was Harry Bidwell Ansted. For over a year and a half, there was a protest movement by students and professors against the law of the U.S. military government in Korea merging colleges. Finally, 320 professors were fired and more than 4,950 students left the school. The university's second president was Lee Choon-ho, who served beginning in October 1947.

The College of Law was founded by merging the law department of Kyŏngsŏng University (Keijō Imperial University) with Kyŏngsŏng Law College. The university absorbed Seoul College of Pharmacy in September 1950, as the College of Pharmacy. This had previously been a private institution.

During the Korean War, the university was occupied by North Korea and Seoul National University Hospital massacre occurred, then temporarily merged with other universities in South Korea, located in Busan.

Relocation
Originally, the main campus (which embraced the College of Humanities and Sciences and College of Law) was in Dongsung-dong, Jongno District. After the construction of a new main campus in Gwanak District in February 1975, most colleges of the university relocated to the new Gwanak Campus between 1975 and 1979 by the request of president Park Chung-hee who disliked student protests at the site where the Gwanak golf club (founded in the early 1960s and relocated in Hwaseong, Gyeonggi) was formerly located. Part of the former main campus in Jongno-gu is still used by the College of Medicine, the College of Dentistry and the College of Nursing and is now called Yeongeon Campus.

In 2012, lawmakers reported that the ruling Saenuri Party, prior to the presidential election in December, seriously proposed a plan to relocate the university to the newly established special autonomous Sejong City.  The move came as part of an overall effort to decentralize the capital's governmental apparatus. Originally the national government had approached the university in 2009 to host the building of a satellite campus. It was reported the following year that the university had considered withdrawing from the Sejong plan.

Academics

Admissions
Admissions to Seoul National University is extremely competitive. From 1981 to 1987, when an applicant could apply only to one university at a time, more than 80% of the top 0.5% scorers in the annual government-administered scholastic achievement test applied to SNU and many of them were unsuccessful.

Academic structure
Sixteen colleges of the university offer 83 undergraduate degree programs. For master and doctoral programs there is one graduate school with 99 programs from five fields of studies. The interdisciplinary programs are the ones invented and operated by more than two departments. In addition to that, there are twelve professional graduate schools.

Colleges 

 College of Humanities
 College of Social Sciences
 College of Business Administration
 College of Education
 College of Fine Arts
 College of Liberal Studies
 College of Human Ecology
 College of Music
 College of Engineering
 College of Natural Sciences
 College of Agriculture & Life Sciences
 College of Medicine
 College of Nursing
 College of Pharmacy
 College of Veterinary Medicine

Professional Graduate Schools 

 Graduate School of Data Science
 Graduate School of Public Health
 Graduate School of Public Administration
 Graduate School of Environmental Studies
 Graduate School of International Studies
 Graduate School of Business
 Graduate School of Convergence Science Technology
 Graduate School of International Agriculture Technology
 Graduate School of Engineering Practice
 School of Law
 School of Dentistry
 School of Medicine

Campus
Seoul National University occupies two Seoul-based, one Pyeongchang-based campuses: the Gwanak Campus is situated in 1 Gwanak-ro, Gwanak-gu; and the Yongon Campus is north of the Han River in Daehangno, Jongno District; and the new Pyeongchang campus in Pyeongchang County, Gangwon Province.

Location
Gwanak Campus, the main campus, is located in the southern part of Seoul. It is served by its own subway station on Line 2. Yeongeon Campus, the medical campus, is on Daehangno (University Street), northeast Seoul. The defunct Suwon Campus, the agricultural campus, also known as the Sangnok Campus (Evergreen Campus), used to be located in Suwon, about 40 km south of Seoul. The agricultural campus moved to Gwanak in Autumn 2004, but some research facilities still remain in Suwon.

Future Campus plans
In February 2010 Seoul National initiated a memorandum with the city of Siheung to establish a global campus. Signed with the city's mayor and governor of Gyeonggi Province for administrative assistance, the university acquired 826 thousand square meters (204 acres) of property in the west-coast economic zone, near the Songdo International Business District, Pyeongtaek harbor, international airport, seaport.

The land acquisition will increase the university's size by 58% over its current 1.4 million square meters (350 acres) to 2.2 million square meters (550 acres) and headcount by an expected 10,000 people or 33% of its current figure.  Along with lecture halls and additional liberal arts and graduate courses, the initiative will add a medical complex including a research hospital and training centre, research centre for dentistry and clinical pharmacology, dormitories, apartments, an international middle and high school, and other facilities. Planning to open the international campus in 2014, the university intends to share the initiative with other regional national institutions.

Facilities

Library

Seoul National University Library is located behind the university administrative building in the 62nd block of the Gwanak Campus. The chief librarian, Dr. Kim Jong-seo, professor of religious studies in the College of Humanities, took office in 2009. Following the completion of Kwanjeong Library in February 2015, the SNU Library reached a size of 57,747 square meters. As of 2022, the library is home to 5.2 million volumes of books as well as over 260,000 academic journals and e-journals, and over 230,000 non-book materials.

The Central Library has constructed a digital library, which in addition to the regular library collection provides access to university publications, ancient texts, and theses. Included here are images of pamphlets, lecture slides, and insects. The digital library offers access to video of university exhibitions, scientific events, symposia, and seminars.

The library was opened in 1946 as the Seoul National University Central Library, inheriting its facilities and books from Kyungsung University. In 1949, the name of the library was changed to the Seoul National University Library Annex. When the main branch of the library was relocated to the Gwanak Campus in January 1975, it was renamed the Seoul National University Library, and then renamed again in 1992 the Seoul National University Central Library.

In 1966, provisions were made to systematize the library's collections. The original library was organized into 12 annexes for each of the university's colleges: engineering, education, physics, art, law, theology, pharmacology, music, medicine, dentistry, administration, and agricultural sciences. Two years later, in 1968, libraries for newspapers and the liberal arts were added to bring the number of annexes to 14. However, as the main branch was moved to the Gwanak Campus, the education, physics, legal, theological, administrative, newspaper, liberal arts, and pharmacological libraries were combined in a single building.

Kyujanggak

The Kyujanggak, also known as Gyujanggak, was the royal library of the Joseon dynasty. It was founded in 1776 by order of King Jeongjo of Joseon, at which time it was located on the grounds of Changdeok Palace. Today known as Kyujanggak Royal Library or Kyujanggak Archives are maintained by Kyujanggak Institute for Korean Studies (규장각한국학연구원, Gyujanggak-Hangukhak-Yeonguwon) at the Seoul National University. It functions as a key repository of Korean historical records and a centre for research and publication of the annual journal Kyujanggak.

Museum
Seoul National University Museum is located at the Gwanak Campus. It opened alongside the university in 1946 under the name "The Seoul National University Museum Annex." The original two-story Dongsung-dong building, which was erected in 1941, had served as the Kyungsung Imperial University Museum until it was transferred intact to SNU. When the museum was moved to the sixth floor of the Central Library, in 1975, it was renamed the Seoul National University Museum. The museum was then moved to newly constructed facilities, next to the Dongwon Building, in 1993, which it has occupied to this day. Dr. Park Nak-gyu is its director.

Museum of Art

Seoul National University Museum of Art (SNUMoA) was established in 1995 with contributions from the Samsung Cultural Foundation after a proposal from Dr. Lee Jong-sang, a professor of Oriental Art. The building was designed by Dutch architect Rem Koolhaas, with construction entrusted to the Samsung Group. The  structure lies three stories above and below ground, with its major distinguishing feature, the forward area, cantilevering off the ground. Construction lasted from 2003 to 2005, and the museum opened on June 8, 2006. Dr. Jung Hung-min assumed directorship of the gallery in 2006.

Gymnasium 

Seoul National University Gymnasium is an indoor sporting arena. The capacity of the arena is 5,000 and was built in 1986 to host table tennis and badminton (demonstration) events at the 1988 Summer Olympics.

Dormitory

The dormitory of Seoul National University is named Gwanaksa (관악사). Dormitories for undergraduate and graduate students as well as families are located here. It was founded August 1975, with five Gwanaksa buildings and one welfare building, which housed 970 male students. The female dormitory was founded in February 1983. By June 2007, there were one administration building, two welfare buildings, 12 undergraduate dormitory buildings, six graduate students’ dormitory buildings, which in total housed 3,680 students. Unlike other university dormitories in South Korea, there is no curfew hour.

The Yeongeonsa located in Yeongeon campus, which is the medical school of Seoul National University. The Yeongeonsa can house 533 undergraduate students and 17 family households.

University Newspaper

The University Newspaper (대학신문, Daehak-Sinmun) is the students' press of Seoul National University. The first edition of the paper was launched while seeking refuge from the ravages of the Korean War, on February 4, 1952. In 1953 it was moved to Dongsung-dong in Seoul, where from 1958 even editions for high school were published. Financial difficulties in 1960 led the paper to cease printing for a time. It was relocated to the Gwanak Campus in 1975, where it has been in continuous publication until the present day. At the time of its first launch the paper was sold for 500 won a copy, sometimes twice a week. Now, however, it is distributed for free every Monday. The school paper is not available during schools breaks or exams.

Reputation and rankings

Reputation
A KEDI study found that the university's name-value translates into wages that are on average about 12 percent higher than that of any other Korean university. SNU graduates dominate South Korea's academics, government, politics and business. Approximately one in four Korean university presidents obtained their undergraduate degree at Seoul National University. Between 2003 and 2009, more students who graduated from science high schools and received presidential scholarships matriculated at Seoul National University than at eight other leading universities combined.

The chiefs of the College Scholastic Ability Test conducted by the government of the Republic of Korea are mainly Seoul National University, and graduates are widely studied in academia, politics and business circles in Korea. At the same time, there is a perception that 'the best university in Korea' or 'the place where the best minds of Korea gather' overlooks many talented people. South Korea is at the cusp of academics and there has been a claim that SNU should be abolished in order to overcome it. In fact, President Roh Moo-hyun had promoted the abolition of Seoul National University and SNU earlier.

International rankings

In 2015, Thomson-Reuters ranked Seoul National University as the 31st most innovative institution in the world. QS World University Rankings (2021）ranked SNU as the best university 37th in the world and 9th in Asia, whilst it is 9th in the independent regional QS Asian University Rankings (2020). SNU is 9th in Asia and 60th in the world according to the 2021 Times Higher Education World University Rankings. In 2019, its World Reputation Rankings were considered it to be 47th globally. Moreover, ARWU (2020) regarded SNU to be among 101st-150th worldwide and the best in the country. CWUR 2020-2021 ranks Seoul National University as 31st best in the world.

QS University Subject Rankings (2018): 25th, Arts and Humanities; 16th, Engineering and Technology; 37th, Life Sciences and Medicine; 21st, Social Sciences and Management; 20th, Natural Sciences.

The institute was ranked 20th in publications by a 2008 analysis of data from the Science Citation Index, and the following year ranked 8th in the world in clinical trials. In 2011, the Mines ParisTech: Professional Ranking World Universities reported that Seoul National University is ranked 10th in the world in terms of the number of alumni holding CEO positions in Fortune 500 enterprises. Seoul National University also had the third highest number of students who went on to earn Ph.Ds in American institutions in 2006.

International partners 
Seoul National University students can study abroad for a semester or a year at partner institutions such as the National Taiwan University, Sciences Po, Sorbonne University, University College London, and the University of Warwick.

Notable alumni and faculty 

Among its notable alumni are prominent figures in international organizations and businesses such as Ban Ki-moon, the eighth secretary-general of the United Nations (UN); Hoesung Lee, chairman of the Intergovernmental Panel on Climate Change (IPCC); Song Sang-hyun, former president of the International Criminal Court (ICC); Lee Jong-wook, the sixth director-general of the World Health Organization (WHO), O-Gon Kwon, former vice president and permanent judge in the International Criminal Tribunal for the former Yugoslavia (ICTY); Kwon Oh-hyun, former CEO and vice chairman of Samsung Electronics; and Bang Si-hyuk, the chairman and founder of HYBE Corporation.

In popular media

 The campus was used as a location for SBS's drama Star's Lover (2008). Specific sites, such as the gallery, Kyujanggak, and museum roads, were filmed to show the university where Kim Chul-soo (Yoo Ji-tae) works, classrooms where he gives his lectures, and the things Lee Ma-ri (Choi Ji-woo) sees and experiences during a school visit. This was the first time the university allowed its campus to be used as a film or TV set.
 In May 2015, the 185th trip of the famous Korean variety show 2 Days & 1 Night helped publicize the university by holding various tasks on the campus in the show's very own fashion.
 In the tvN drama Reply 1988 (2016), Ryu Hye-young portrays Sung Bo-ra, an SNU student majoring in math education.
 In the hit JTBC drama Sky Castle (2018–2019), SNU figures heavily in the plot.
 In Netflix's critically acclaimed and hugely popular series Squid Game (2021), main character Cho Sang-woo's attendance at SNU is a recurring plot point.
 In the tvN drama Hometown Cha-Cha-Cha (2021), main character Hong Du-sik is an SNU graduate.
 In the SBS TV drama The Penthouse: War in Life (2020–2021), many of the characters describe SNU as the ideal university to attend.

See also
TEPS
Seoul National University Hospital
Seoul National University station
Flagship Korean National Universities
List of national universities in South Korea
List of universities and colleges in South Korea
Education in South Korea

Notes

References

Further reading
Seoul National University, ""(The 40 years history of Seoul National University), 1986.

External links

 
 

 
1946 establishments in Korea
Educational institutions established in 1946
Universities established in the 1940s
Universities and colleges in Seoul
National universities and colleges in South Korea
Gwanak District